Caladenia clarkiae, commonly known as pink caps, is a plant in the orchid family Orchidaceae and is endemic to south-eastern Australia. It is a ground orchid which grows singly or in small groups in Victoria and New South Wales. It has a single leaf and usually one or two white to pale pink flowers with darker pink tips.

Description

The lateral sepals and petals are lance-shaped but curved and spread widely. There are golf-stick shape calli along the edges of the labellum and four rows of yellow to white calli in the centre. The column has narrow wings and is greenish with red markings. Flowering occurs from September to November.

Taxonomy and naming
Caladenia clarkiae was first formally described by David L. Jones in 1991 and the description was published in Australian Orchid Research. The type specimen was collected in the Colquhoun State Forest. The specific epithet (clarkiae) honours "Ruth Clark of Lakes Entrance", an orchid enthusiast and assistant to David Jones.

Distribution and habitat
This caladenia occurs in eastern Victoria and in New South Wales south from Eden where it grows in forest among grasses or low shrubs in well-drained loam.

References

clarkiae
Plants described in 1991
Endemic orchids of Australia
Orchids of New South Wales
Orchids of Victoria (Australia)
Taxa named by David L. Jones (botanist)